Cho Hyung-Ik (Hangul: 조형익; born 13 September 1985) is a South Korean footballer who plays as winger or midfielder.

Club career

Cho Hyung-Ik was drafted from Myongji University in Yongin, just south of Seoul to Daegu FC for the 2008 season. A winger, he established himself as part of the first team squad, playing in over 30 games in all competitions in 2008.  He continued to play a key role for the team in 2009, scoring 3 goals in the K-League, and a further 3 in the League Cup. In his third season with Daegu, Cho scored 8 league goals and added 1 goal in the League Cup.

On 5 March 2011, Cho scored his first goal of the new season with a goal in a 2–3 away loss against Gwangju FC. He was implicated in the 2011 South Korean football match-fixing scandal and was suspended from the K-League for 2 years.

In 2013, the K-League reduced his disciplinary punishment and he was allowed to return to professional football with Daegu FC.

Club career statistics

References

External links 

1985 births
Living people
Association football midfielders
South Korean footballers
Daegu FC players
K League 1 players
K League 2 players
Myongji University alumni